Thomas Raeside was a Scottish football player, who played for Dumbarton and King's Park during the 1910s and 1920s. He also had a short loan spell with Bo'ness.

References 

Scottish footballers
Dumbarton F.C. players
Bo'ness F.C. players
Scottish Football League players
King's Park F.C. players
Association football defenders